{{DISPLAYTITLE:C13H14N2}}
The molecular formula C13H14N2 may refer to:

 Lanicemine, a low-trapping NMDA receptor antagonist
 4,4'-Methylenedianiline, an organic compound produced on industrial scale as a precursor to polyurethanes
 Tacrine, a centrally acting acetylcholinesterase inhibitor and parasympathomimetic